Gigafactory Berlin-Brandenburg (also known as Giga Berlin or Gigafactory 4) is a manufacturing plant for Tesla, Inc. in Grünheide, Brandenburg, Germany.
It is Tesla's first manufacturing location in Europe.

The facility and its Brandenburg location were announced by Tesla CEO Elon Musk on November 12, 2019 at the Das Goldene Lenkrad award show. The factory is planned to produce batteries, battery packs and powertrains for use in Tesla vehicles, and also assemble the Tesla Model Y, with a proposed start of production in 2021.  Construction work had already begun by early 2020 with site preparation and foundation work underway. According to a January 2020 publication by the local environmental agency, the factory was expected to begin operations in July 2021. It was delayed due to administrative troubles. However, the "Giga Fest" celebration of completion was held in October 2021. On 22 March 2022, the factory was officially opened.

History

Planning and locating (2015–2018) 
Initial discussion of a Tesla gigafactory in Europe occurred as early as 2015.  The factory was then thought to be a combined electric battery manufacturing facility and automobile factory. In 2016, Tesla was anticipating to announce the factory in 2017.

The factory had earlier been occasionally referred to as "Gigafactory 2" prior to 22 February 2017, when Tesla began to refer to the SolarCity Gigafactory in Buffalo, New York as Gigafactory 2.  By 2017, the Europe Gigafactory was expected to be named either Gigafactory 4 or 5.  In November 2019, it became Gigafactory 4 and then Gigafactory Berlin-Brandenburg.

More than ten European countries had campaigned to have the factory located within their jurisdictions.
 In April 2016, a French minister suggested turning the soon to be shuttered Fessenheim Nuclear Power Plant into Gigafactory 2, supported by two ministers.
 The Dutch minister of economic affairs, Henk Kamp, announced plans to attract Tesla later in 2016, and campaigned for the plant at several locations. They promoted the idea of synergy with the European headquarters of Tesla, already located in the Netherlands, which is a finishing plant.
 The Czech Republic near Prague was reported as a possibility in 2016.  A nearby  lithium deposit was thought a relevant factor, at the time. 
 Germany's then-federal minister for economic affairs and energy, Sigmar Gabriel, stated that Tesla was in talks with the government during 2015 over a Gigafactory there. Authorities, companies and over 100,000 citizens in the Lower Lusatia region ( southeast of Berlin, near the Germany–Poland border) urged Tesla to consider siting a factory in the region, close to the Czech lithium. They suggested the EuroSpeedway Lausitz for drive tests, along with Dekra.
 Portugal pursued the plant in 2016 with an internet campaign and governmental negotiations. Portugal has the largest lithium reserves in Europe.
 Paterna, Spain was also in pursuit of being selected by late 2016.
 Finland's city of Vaasa announced a government supported initiative to attract the factory in 2016, citing both nearby lithium carbonate deposits, a large refinery for cobalt and an annual 50,000-tonne nickel production.
 Lithuania drew the attention of Tesla in January 2017 when the local gaming community united to recreate the potential Gigafactory in the virtual world of Minecraft.
 The Estonian government was also pursuing Tesla to be selected, claiming a good geographical and logistical location, plus 140 MW renewable energy with total control over the pricing for the factory in PAKRI Smart Industrial City at Pakri Peninsula.

There was intense competition among European countries to host the Gigafactory because of its expected significant contribution to the economy. The sprawling facility, which is expected to be one of the largest manufacturing lines in Europe, will need a considerable number of employees despite many highly automated processes. There is also a concerted effort in the region to encourage battery manufacturing since it is viewed as a strategic economic measure due to an increasing global transition towards renewable energy. A 2018 report revealed, for instance, that the world will need at least 25 more gigafactories by 2025. The projected uptick in demand for electric cars and in-home power storage systems is causing concern about a European fuel dependency on Asia, which, as of early 2018, accounted for 88 per cent of global battery manufacturing capacity. By 2018, European governments were providing subsidies and incentives to companies like Tesla as well as local battery manufacturing startups like Northvolt and TerraE to build production infrastructure within its borders. According to Matthias Machnig, state secretary at the German economy ministry:We are in the center of the biggest and deepest change in the automotive industry since its beginning. We would be naïve to think we can handle battery technology as a commodity that can be bought anywhere in the world.

Construction and opening (2019–2021) 
Giga Berlin is expected to produce batteries, battery packs and powertrains for use in Tesla vehicles. It will also do assembly of the Tesla Model Y, which had been previously announced for Gigafactory 4 in March 2019. Construction of the facility was then planned to begin in early 2020, with a proposed start of production in late 2021. Musk also announced the establishment of a new design and development centre in nearby Berlin.

By February 2020, environmental challenges had been cleared in court decisions which allowed vegetation on the site to begin being cleared.

Construction work had begun by May 2020 with initial foundation work underway, the set up of the first four construction cranes, and the beginning of the arrival of trainloads of building materials including pillars and beams. Musk has stated the construction will come together at an "impossible-seeming speed" due to the use of prefabricated construction techniques.

On 9 October 2021, Tesla held the Gigafactory Berlin-Brandenburg County Fair where they invited 9000 local guests to tour the factory.

Approval and production (2022–) 
In March 2022, the government of Brandenburg granted Giga Berlin-Brandenburg its final environmental approval. However, the approval did not give Tesla the capacity to immediately start. On 22 March 2022, Giga Berlin was officially opened. Several protesters gathered outside the facility to raise their concerns. By 29 April, the factory started to produce Model Y Performance with 2170-cells. In October, Tesla confirmed that it achieved a production of 2,000 units per week. However, it was reported, in December, that the company has faced issues with filing positions, working conditions, retaining trained employees, and a high level of absenteeism at the factory.

Gigafactory Berlin-Brandenburg description 

Gigafactory Berlin-Brandenburg will manufacture batteries, battery packs, powertrains and seats with work including casting, stamping, painting, drivetrain assembly and final assembly of Model Y and future models with an annual capacity eventually reaching 500,000 cars. Initial production will be of the Tesla Model Y. The expected cost for the factory is around €4 billion.

Site description 

Extending north from the  "GVZ Freienbrink" logistics centre, the area was an undeveloped  greenfield land site designated industrial zone. It was planned as a location for a BMW car factory around the year 2000, but BMW chose Saxony instead. Much larger pine plantations in a landscape-scale conservation surrounds Freienbrink. A state-owned man-made forest of low-quality monoculture harvest-ready planted pine trees occupied the site, and authorities expected Tesla to mitigate felling by planting new trees of more diverse variety. 160 hectares of plantation was cleared for the factory, and by 2022, 265 hectares of new multiple-species forest had been planted elsewhere. The pine plantation is planned to be upgraded with more species.

Old ordnance complicated site clearing, and seven bombs (85 kg total) were disposed in a controlled explosion on 26 January 2020.

The site also interrupts the route of the Old Postal Road (Grünheide Alte Poststraße).

Purchase contract on the land was expected to be completed in December 2019.
In December 2019, Tesla clarified an expected European Gigafactory production rate of approximately 500,000 vehicles per year.  Tesla was to pay €13.50 per square metre for the  site, to the sum of ~€41 million. In January 2020 German media reported that Tesla had approved the contract to buy the land for €41 million; Tesla signed the contract and the state notarised the contract on 29 January 2020.

The environment report indicates that the ground is valley sand, and contains some pollution with heavy metals.

In July 2020, Elon Musk tweeted a picture of what the finalised Berlin-Brandenburg Gigafactory would look like.

Logistics 
The current water supply (from Strausberg-Erkner) is sufficient for the first phase of a quarter million cars, but the second (to half a million cars) and third (to 3–4 million cars) phases need further water supply. Water purification is to be supplied by distillation and reverse osmosis.

Some of the reasons for choosing Brandenburg were that the industrial site is expandable, the state has the highest production of green power per citizen in Germany, and there are qualified workers in the area. Suppliers also set up facilities in the area.

Site concerns 
The project is subject to a number of concerns, including potential impacts to the water supply and local wildlife, and about proper wastewater disposal. In the public hearing in Stadthalle Erkner protesters were concerned that the chemicals in the factory pose a violation of the AwSV §49, which means that the plans for the factory must be stopped. Among the forest residents are reptiles, ants and birds which must be relocated before felling. There may be an endangered species of bat; the district forester who planted trees says the bats prefer trees older than 80 years to roost in them.

A group of neighbouring municipalities formed in December 2019 to handle issues like traffic, infrastructure and residential developments.

Unexploded WWII-era bombs are commonly found in German ground, and 85 kg were disposed at the site in January 2020.

On 9 April 2020, Potsdamer Neueste Nachrichten (also known as The PNN) reported the soil in the foundation area is sandy, therefore requiring a different type of foundation than what was planned. According to the report, the changes are not simple. Tesla will need to update their application with the local government, probably requiring a public hearing.

On 15 October 2020, Associated Press reported that the German utility company WSE was shutting off water to the construction site due to unpaid bills. The bill was paid and the water was restored the next day.

Incidents 
On 26 September 2022, a fire broke out at the factory after  of cardboard and wood caught fire in the factory's recycling facility. The fire brigades of the municipality of Grünheide were called at 3:33 a.m. by the Tesla plant fire brigade. 50 firefighters was dispatched, which fought the fire until close to 8:00 am. No injuries were reported. Criticisms came from groups opposing the factory construction, such as the citizens' initiatives and the Strausberg Erkner Water Board (WSE), which called for an immediate stop of Giga Berlin's vehicle production.

See also 
 List of Tesla factories

References

External links

 
 Location at Wikimapia
 Photos, on site and satellite
 Erection of first pillars, time lapse video, via YouTube, 1 July 2020.

Berlin
Buildings and structures in Oder-Spree
Motor vehicle assembly plants in Germany
Battery (electricity)
Economy of Brandenburg
Berlin, Giga